The tenth season of the American reality television series Food Network Star premiered  June 1, 2014 on Food Network.

Season 10 continued the season 8 concept of having Bobby Flay, Giada De Laurentiis and Alton Brown mentor the contestants, as well as the Star Salvation web series from season 9. Star Salvation was hosted by season 9 winner Damaris Phillips and Iron Chef Geoffrey Zakarian. In addition to eliminated contestants from this season, Chad Rosenthal (season 9) and Martie Duncan (season 8) competed in Star Salvation.

Contestants

Winner
Lenny McNab - De Beque, Colorado

Runners-up
 Luca Della Casa - San Antonio, Texas
 Nicole Gaffney - Atlantic City, New Jersey

Eliminated
(In order of elimination)
Donna Sonkin Shaw - New York City, New York
 Luca Della Casa - San Antonio, Texas (Returned to the competition after winning "Star Salvation")
Kenny Lao - New York, New York
Aryen Moore-Alston - Memphis, Tennessee
Christopher Lynch - New Orleans, Louisiana
Reuben Ruiz - Miami, Florida
Chris Kyler- Stafford, Virginia
 Emma Frisch - Ithaca, New York
 Loreal Gavin - Indianapolis, Indiana
Sarah Penrod - League City, Texas

Contestant progress

 
: Nicole won the mini-challenge but was in the bottom three for the main challenge.
: Nicole was eliminated from the final three midway through the finale.
 (WINNER) The contestant won the competition and became the next "Food Network Star".
 (RUNNER-UP) The contestant made it to the finale, but did not win.
 (WIN) The contestant won the challenge for that week.
 (RETURNED) The contestant won Star Salvation and returned to the main competition.
 (HIGH) The contestant was one of the Selection Committee's favorites for that week.
 (IN) The contestant was not one of the Selection Committee's favorites nor their least favorites. They were not up for elimination.
 (LOW) The contestant was one of the Selection Committee's three or four least favorites for that week, but was not eliminated.
 (LOW) The contestant was one of the Selection Committee's two least favorites for that week, but was not eliminated.
 (OUT) The contestant was the Selection Committee's least favorite for that week, and was eliminated.

Star Salvation
Following the success of Season 9, Star Salvation returned for a second season. Hosted this time by Geoffrey Zakarian and season 9 champion Damaris Phillips, each episode features the most recently eliminated contestant competing against the remaining previously eliminated contestants for a second chance at winning.  In addition, this season included Season 8 Fan Favorite Martie Duncan and Season 9 Fan Favorite Chad Rosenthal competing alongside the eliminated chefs.

 (WIN) The chef won Star Salvation and returned to the main competition.
 (IN) The chef continued in the competition.
 (OUT) The chef lost in that week's Star Salvation and was eliminated from the competition.

Episode 1
 Advanced: Chad and Martie
 Eliminated: Donna

Episode 2
 Advanced: Chad and Luca
 Eliminated: Martie

Episode 3
 Advanced: Chad and Luca
 Eliminated: Kenny

Episode 4
 Advanced: Chad and Luca
 Eliminated: Aryen

Episode 5
 Advanced: Chad and Luca
 Eliminated: Christopher

Episode 6
 Advanced: Luca
 Eliminated, Round 2: Reuben
 Eliminated, Round 1: Chad

Episodes

Episode 1: Hollywood Calling!
High: Lenny, Loreal and Nicole
Low: Emma, Sarah and Donna
Out: Donna

Original Air Date: May 31, 2014

Episode 2: Please Try This at Home
High: Lenny
Low: Kenny, Chris and Luca
Out: Luca

Original Air Date: June 7, 2014

Episode 3: Cutthroat Food Star
Winner of Heat 1: Christopher
Winner of Heat 2: Emma
Low: Lenny, Chris, Loreal and Kenny
Out: Kenny

Original Air Date: June 14, 2014

Episode 4: Internet Marketing Video
Winners: Emma, Nicole and Reuben
Low: Lenny, Christopher and Aryen
Out: Aryen

Original Air Date: June 21, 2014

Episode 5: Live Demo at Knott's Berry Farm
High: Lenny and Loreal
Low: Reuben and Christopher
Out: Christopher

Original Air Date: June 28, 2014

Episode 6: Product Commercial
High: Loreal and Chris
Low: Emma, Nicole and Reuben
Out: Reuben

Original Air Date: July 5, 2014

Episode 7: Vegas Pool Party
Returned: Luca
High: Lenny
Low: Emma, Sarah and Chris
Out: Chris

Original Air Date: July 12, 2014

Episode 8: One-of-a-Kind Experience
Winners: Sarah, Luca and Nicole
Low: Lenny, Loreal and Emma
Out: Emma

Original Air Date: July 19, 2014

Episode 9: Rachael Ray Show
High: Luca and Lenny
Low: Nicole, Sarah and Loreal
Out: Loreal

Original Air Date: July 26, 2014

Episode 10: Promos and Pilots
Advanced: Luca, Nicole, and Lenny
Out: Sarah

Original Air Date: August 2, 2014

Episode 11: A Food Star is Born
Runners-up: Nicole Gaffney and Luca Della Casa
The Next Food Network Star: Lenny McNab
Show on Food Network: Cowboy Up

Original Air Date: August 9, 2014

References

External links
 
 

Food Network Star
2014 American television seasons